Anthem of Kryvyi Rih is the anthem of the city of Kryvyi Rih, Ukraine. It was adopted officially in 2002.

Lyrics

References

External links 
 The anthem in various languages
Ukrainian songs